Ohukabia is one of the 9 villages that make up Nawfija Community in Nigeria. Ohukabia was formerly known as Agbakwulu.

Populated places in Anambra State